Dina Yakerson (born 1983) is an Israeli art historian and artist. She is the daughter of Shimon Iakerson.

Biography 
She was born in Saint Petersburg (1983) and immigrated to Israel (1990). 

Studied fine art at Hamidrasha School of Art — Beit Berl College, at Metafora — International Workshop, Barcelona, Spain. She also studied at the International Curatorial Program, CCA and the Kibuzim-Seminar, Tel Aviv, as well as completing her master's degree at the ZHDK – Zurich University of the Arts, Switzerland.

Currently, she lives and works in Jaffa. She has exhibited her works at various art spaces and galleries in Israel, Spain and Russia.

Israeli artist and curator Yakerson explores diverse works by migrant artists that focus on the themes of migration and displacement.

Selected exhibitions
2008 «Figurativo», personal exhibition, Belchica Gallery, Barcelona, Spain
2008 «Terra de Ningu», group exhibition, Polidor Center, San Adrián, Spain
2008 «Fridolf Doesn’t Weld», group exhibition, International workshop Metafor, Barcelona, Spain
2008 «Whiter Shades of Pale», group exhibition, International workshop Metafor, Barcelona, Spain
2010 «Salon de Refuses», group exhibition, Amiad Center, Jaffa, Israel
2010 «Grobman», group exhibition, Kishon Gallery, group exhibition, Tel Aviv, Israel
2011 «Moledet | Rodina», group exhibition, Center for Contemporary Art Pyramida, Haifa, Israel
2014 «Spring Salon», group exhibition, Jaffa Salon Art Gallery, Jaffa, Israel
2015 «Bread & Roses», group exhibition, Shenkar College, Ramat Gan, Israel
2016 «Miklat 209 — Performance Art Platform», group exhibition, Miklat 209, Tel Aviv, Israel
2016 Artemisia Art Gallery, group exhibition, Tel Aviv, Israel
2016 «Painting Camp 2016», group exhibition, Negev Museum of Art, Beersheba, Israel
2018 «Minotaur & the Fish», personal exhibition, House of Artists, Tel Aviv, Israel
2018 «Lubok», personal exhibition, Gallery 4, Tel Aviv, Israel
2019 «Shesh-Besh», personal exhibition, DiDi Gallery, St. Petersburg, Russia

References

External links 

 
 
 
 
 

1983 births
Living people
Israeli women artists
21st-century Israeli painters
Israeli women painters
21st-century Russian women artists
Painters from Saint Petersburg
Russian emigrants to Israel
Israeli art historians
Women art historians
21st-century Israeli  historians
Zurich University of the Arts alumni
Israeli expatriates in Switzerland